Michael Mullen (born 1946) is a US Navy admiral and a former Chairman of the Joint Chiefs of Staff for the US military.

Michael Mullen may also refer to:
Michael Mullen (Irish politician) (1919–1982), Irish Labour Party politician represented Dublin North West from 1961 to 1969
Michael Mullen (novelist), Irish novelist based in Mayo
Michael M. Mullen (1918–1978), Pennsylvania politician

See also
Mike Mullane (born 1945), former astronaut and author
Mike Mullin (disambiguation)